The 27th Academy Awards were held on March 30, 1955 to honor the best films of 1954, hosted by Bob Hope at the RKO Pantages Theatre in Hollywood. 

On the Waterfront led the ceremony with twelve nominations and eight wins, including Best Picture. Its total wins tied the record of Gone with the Wind (1939) and From Here to Eternity (1953), though those each had thirteen nominations. It was the third film to receive five acting nominations, and the first to receive three in the Best Supporting Actor category. A "rematch" occurred in the category of Best Actor between Marlon Brando and Humphrey Bogart following Bogart's upset victory three years earlier. In an upset (Bing Crosby was the favored nominee), Brando won, now seen as one of the greatest Best Actor wins in Oscar history. This was Brando's fourth consecutive nomination for Best Actor (starting with A Streetcar Named Desire in 1951), a record that remains unmatched to this day.

In an even bigger upset, Grace Kelly won Best Actress for The Country Girl over Judy Garland, who was heavily favored to win for A Star Is Born. Garland could not attend the ceremony, having recently given birth to her third child; cameramen were present in her home so she could give an acceptance speech, only to awkwardly leave when Kelly was announced as the winner. Groucho Marx later sent her a telegram expressing that her loss was "the biggest robbery since Brink's".

Dorothy Dandridge became the first African American actress to receive a nomination for Best Actress.

Awards

Nominees were announced on February 12, 1955. Winners are listed first and highlighted in boldface.

Academy Honorary Awards
Bausch and Lomb Optical "for their contributions to the advancement of the motion picture industry".
Kemp R. Niver "for the development of the Renovare Process which has made possible the restoration of the Library of Congress Paper Film Collection".
Greta Garbo "for her unforgettable screen performances".
Danny Kaye "for his unique talents, his service to the Academy, the motion picture industry, and the American people".
Jon Whiteley "for his outstanding juvenile performance in The Little Kidnappers".
Vincent Winter "for his outstanding juvenile performance in The Little Kidnappers".

Best Foreign Language Film
Jigokumon (Gate of Hell) (Japan)

Presenters and performers

Presenters
Grace Kelly (Presenter: Documentary Awards)
Donna Reed (Presenter: Best Supporting Actor)
Lee J. Cobb (Presenter: Best Special Effects)
Dorothy Dandridge (Presenter: Best Film Editing)
Nina Foch and Jane Wyman (Presenters: Costume Design Awards)
Dan O'Herlihy and Jan Sterling (Presenters: Art Direction Awards)
Humphrey Bogart (Presenter: Best Cinematography, Black-and-White)
Katy Jurado (Presenter: Best Cinematography, Color)
Jean Marie Ingels (Presenter: Best Foreign Language Film)
Charles Brackett (Presenter: Honorary Awards)
Merle Oberon (Presenter: Honorary Awards — Juvenile Performances)
Lauren Bacall (Presenter: Scientific and Technical Awards)
Marlon Brando (Presenter: Best Director)
Audrey Hepburn, Karl Malden, and Claire Trevor (Presenters: Writing Awards)
Bing Crosby (Presenter: Music Awards)
Frank Sinatra (Presenter: Best Supporting Actress)
William Holden (Presenter: Best Actress)
Bette Davis (Presenter: Best Actor)
Edmond O'Brien, Eva Marie Saint, and Rod Steiger (Presenters: Short Subjects Awards)
Tom Tully (Presenter: Best Sound Recording)
Buddy Adler (Presenter: Best Picture)

Performers
David Rose (musical director)
Rosemary Clooney ("The Man That Got Away" from A Star Is Born)
Johnny Desmond and Muzzy Marcellino ("The High and the Mighty" from The High and the Mighty)
Peggy King ("Count Your Blessings Instead of Sheep" from White Christmas)
Dean Martin ("Three Coins in the Fountain" from Three Coins in the Fountain)
Tony Martin ("Hold My Hand" from Susan Slept Here)

Multiple nominations and awards

These films had multiple nominations:

12 nominations: On the Waterfront
7 nominations: The Caine Mutiny and The Country Girl
6 nominations: The High and the Mighty, Sabrina and A Star Is Born
5 nominations: Seven Brides for Seven Brothers
4 nominations: Executive Suite and Rear Window
3 nominations: 20,000 Leagues Under the Sea, Brigadoon, The Glenn Miller Story, There's No Business Like Show Business and Three Coins in the Fountain
2 nominations: The Barefoot Contessa, Broken Lance, Carmen Jones, Désirée, Genevieve, Jet Carrier, The Silver Chalice and Susan Slept Here

The following films received multiple awards.

8 wins: On the Waterfront
2 wins: 20,000 Leagues Under the Sea, The Country Girl and Three Coins in the Fountain

See also

12th Golden Globe Awards
1954 in film
 6th Primetime Emmy Awards
 7th Primetime Emmy Awards
 8th British Academy Film Awards
 9th Tony Awards

References

External links
 1954 Academy Awards Winners and History
 1954 Academy Awards at the Internet Movie Database
 

Academy Awards ceremonies
1954 film awards
1954 awards in the United States
1955 in Los Angeles
1955 in New York City
1955 in American cinema
March 1955 events in the United States
Events in New York City
1950s in Manhattan